Norse is a demonym for Norsemen, a Medieval North Germanic ethnolinguistic group ancestral to modern Scandinavians, defined as speakers of Old Norse from about the 9th to the 13th centuries.

Norse may also refer to:

Culture and religion
 Norse mythology
 Norse paganism
 Norse art 
 Norse activity in the British Isles
 Vikings

Language 
 Proto-Norse language, the Germanic language predecessor of Old Norse
 Old Norse, a North Germanic language spoken in Scandinavia and areas under Scandinavian influence from c. 800 AD to c. 1300 AD
 Old West Norse, the western dialect of Old Norse, spoken in Norway and areas under Norwegian influence
 Greenlandic Norse
 Norn language, an extinct North Germanic language that was spoken in Shetland and Orkney, off the north coast of mainland Scotland, and in Caithness
 Old East Norse, the eastern dialect of Old Norse, spoken in Denmark, Sweden and areas under their influence

Location 
 Norse, Texas, a ghost town founded by Nordic pioneers
 Norway
 Nordic countries
 Scandinavia

Companies 
 Norse Atlantic Airways, a Norwegian airline
 Norse Projects, a Danish clothing brand

Sport 
 Luther College Norse, the intercollegiate athletic program of Luther College
 Mesabi Range Norse, the intercollegiate athletic program of Mesabi Range College
 Northern Kentucky Norse, the intercollegiate athletic program of Northern Kentucky University

Other uses
 Harold Norse (1916–2009), American poet
 NORSE, acronym for new-onset refractory status epilepticus
 Norse (neuron simulator), a simulation environment for biological neurons; see

See also
 
 Nordic (disambiguation)
 Norsca, a fictional land in the Warhammer Fantasy game setting